Engine House No. 11 may refer to:
 Engine House No. 11 (Detroit)
 Engine House No. 11 (Tacoma, Washington)

See also
Engine House (disambiguation)